Ich'ŏn County is a kun, or county, in northern Kangwŏn province, North Korea.  The terrain is predominantly high and mountainous; the highest point is Myongidoksan, 1,585 meters above sea level. The county's borders run along the Masingryong and Ryongam ranges. The chief stream is the Rimjin River.

Administrative divisions
Ich'ŏn county is divided into 1 ŭp (town) and 22 ri (villages):

Economy

Agriculture
Agriculture is limited to the low-lying regions. Sericulture (silk farming) is also practised. Due to the abundant woods, lumbering is also an important industry.

Mining
There are deposits of gold, asbestos, nickel and lead in the county.

Transport
Ich'ŏn is served by roads, and by the Ch'ŏngnyŏn Ich'ŏn line of the Korean State Railway.

See also
Geography of North Korea
Administrative divisions of North Korea

References

External links

Counties of Kangwon Province (North Korea)